Matt Brady (born October 1, 1965) is an American college basketball coach who is currently an assistant coach for the Maryland men's basketball team. He is a former head coach at James Madison and Marist.

Career

Early career 
After playing basketball for Siena, Brady worked as assistant at Rhode Island, Wagner, and Saint Joseph's.

Marist 
Brady was hired as head coach by Marist in 2004 and coached the Foxes for four years, finishing with a 73–50 record. He took the Red Foxes to a MAAC regular-season championship in 2007. Marist then advanced to the NIT, where it defeated Oklahoma State in the first round. The NIT victory was the first ever postseason victory for Marist.

James Madison 
Brady was introduced as head coach of James Madison at a press conference on March 26, 2008. After leaving Marist, the school filed suit against Brady, arguing he had violated the terms of the contract by accepting the JMU job and bringing certain players with him to the Dukes. A jury found in favor of Marist, but did not award any damages.

At Madison, Brady took over a program that had not had a winning record since going 20–9 in the 1999–2000 season under Sherman Dillard. In 2009, Brady inherited an experienced core of upperclassmen from Keener and, with a skilled group of freshmen, engineered a respectable inaugural campaign, leading the Dukes to an 18–13 regular season record. Thanks to the addition of a new postseason invitational—the CollegeInsider.com Tournament—Madison achieved its first 20-win season since 1994, when Hall of Fame coach Lefty Driesell led the program to the NCAA tournament.

The record dipped significantly in 2009–10, in part because of the loss of two key players to injuries: point guard Devon Moore, an all-rookie pick in the CAA in 2009, and forward Andrey Semenov. After up and down season in 2011 and 2012, the Dukes won the CAA tournament in 2013 after finishing in fourth place in the CAA regular season. As a result, they received the conference's automatic bid to the NCAA tournament where they defeated Long Island in the First Four marking the school's first NCAA Tournament win since 1983. In the Second Round of the Tournament, they lost to No. 1 seed Indiana.

After another down season in 2014, the Dukes finished in a first place tie in the CAA regular season, but could not win the CAA tournament, and received a bid to the CIT tournament where they lost in the first round.

Despite a 21-win season in 2016, Brady was fired due to allegedly declining attendance at Dukes' games.

Recent years 
Following his dismissal from the Dukes, Brady was hired as an assistant coach for La Salle University. In July 2017, Brady was hired to be the Director of Player Personnel at Maryland. In 2018, he was promoted to assistant coach.

Head coaching record

References

External links
 Maryland profile
 James Madison profile

Living people
1965 births
American men's basketball coaches
American men's basketball players
Basketball coaches from New Jersey
Basketball players from New Jersey
College men's basketball head coaches in the United States
James Madison Dukes men's basketball coaches
La Salle Explorers men's basketball coaches
Marist Red Foxes men's basketball coaches
People from Haddon Heights, New Jersey
Rhode Island Rams men's basketball coaches
Saint Joseph's Hawks men's basketball coaches
Siena Saints men's basketball players
Sportspeople from Camden County, New Jersey
Wagner Seahawks men's basketball coaches